This was the first edition of the tournament. It was originally scheduled to take place in Florianópolis but was relocated to São Paulo and took the São Paulo Challenger de Tênis namesake.

Luis David Martínez and Felipe Meligeni Alves won the title after defeating Rogério Dutra Silva and Fernando Romboli 6–3, 6–3 in the final.

Seeds

Draw

References

External links
 Main draw

São Paulo Challenger de Tênis - Doubles
2020 Doubles